Alpine Museum may refer to:

 Swiss Alpine Museum, Bern
 Alpine Museum Chamonix
 Alpine Museum Zermatt
 National Alpine Museum of Australia